The Spartanburg Subdivision is a railroad line owned by CSX Transportation in the U.S. state of South Carolina. At its north end the line continues north on the Blue Ridge Subdivision and at its south end the line continues south as the Monroe Subdivision.

See also
 List of CSX Transportation lines

References

CSX Transportation lines